James Kenneth Lowry (born 1942) is a zoologist specialising in amphipods.

He retired as a principal research scientist at the Australian Museum, where he worked from 1976 to 2011. 

He earned his first degree from the University of Richmond and his Ph. D. from the University of Canterbury in 1976 with the thesis, Studies on the macrobenthos of the Southern Ocean. In 1972, Lowry survived five days on Antarctic sea ice, with three fellow students, after a late-evening sail went wrong.  

His zoological author abbreviation is Lowry. He has authored over 500 taxa. See also: :Category:Taxa named by James K. Lowry and this query.

Publications

References

20th-century Australian zoologists
Living people
1942 births
21st-century Australian zoologists